The Mountain of the Lord is a 72-minute film produced by the Church of Jesus Christ of Latter-day Saints. It depicts the story of the building of the Salt Lake Temple in a fictional encounter between a reporter and Wilford Woodruff and was produced for the centennial of its dedication.  The film shows the struggles of early Mormons to build the temple—which took 40 years to complete—in the Salt Lake Valley, where church members arrived in 1847.

The film was shown in connection with the April 1993 General Conference.

Production
Parts of the film were shot in Provo, Utah.

References

External links

 
 
 The Mountain of the Lord on YouTube from the Mormon Channel

1993 films
1993 in Christianity
Films produced by the Church of Jesus Christ of Latter-day Saints
Temples (LDS Church)
Films shot in Utah
Salt Lake Temple
1990s English-language films